Anton Zaslavski (born 2 September 1989), known professionally as Zedd, is a Russian-German DJ, record producer, and songwriter.

Zedd grew up and began his musical journey in Kaiserslautern, Germany. His stage name, Zedd, was derived from zed, the English pronunciation, barring American English, for the first letter of his surname, Z. In 2012, he released "Clarity" (featuring Foxes), which propelled him to mainstream success, reaching the 8th position on the Billboard Hot 100 and earning him a Grammy for Best Dance Recording at the 56th Grammy Awards. Later in 2012, he released his debut studio album, Clarity, with hit single "Stay the Night" (featuring Hayley Williams) appearing on the 2013 deluxe edition of the album.

In 2015, his second studio album, True Colors, was released, supported by its lead single, "I Want You to Know", featuring Selena Gomez. Subsequent well-known songs include "Stay" with Alessia Cara, peaking at number 7; "The Middle" with Maren Morris and Grey; and, as a featured artist, "Break Free" with Ariana Grande, peaking at number 4 in the US.

Early life
Anton Zaslavski was born on 2 September 1989 in Saratov, Soviet Russia, to a Jewish family. He grew up in Dansenberg, Kaiserslautern, Germany, after his family moved there when Anton was three years old. He reportedly is a classically trained musician, the son of two musicians. His father, Igor Zaslavski, is a guitarist and schoolteacher, and his mother is a piano teacher. He began playing the piano at the age of four and drums at twelve years old. He has an older brother, Arkadi, and a younger half brother, Daniel. In 2002, Zaslavski began playing for the German deathcore band Dioramic, signed by Lifeforce Records. Zaslavski's interest in producing electronic music was piqued after hearing Cross by the French electronic duo Justice.

Career

2010–2011: Beginnings 

After leaving Dioramic in 2010, Zedd won two Beatport remix contests in 2010; his first original release, "The Anthem", entered the Beatport Electro house chart in the top 20.

He also remixed Skrillex's "Scary Monsters and Nice Sprites". He has since produced remixes of well-known artists, including Justin Bieber, Lady Gaga, the Black Eyed Peas, Enhypen, Twice, Madeon, Porter Robinson, Krewella, Galantis, Deadmau5, Blackpink, Periphery and others. Zedd now sits as one of the top producers of the decade. Zaslavski creates his music using the Cubase suite of music production applications, and uses plug-ins such as the Sylenth1, Nexus, SynthMaster 2.6, and Omnisphere synthesizers, and the Kontakt sampler.

Zedd's remix of Lady Gaga's track "Born This Way" appeared on the special edition of her third studio album, Born This Way (2011). In 2011, his single "Shave It Up" (then known as "Shave It") became Zedd's first release on Owsla. Zedd went on to release "Slam the Door" and "Shotgun" with OWSLA before departing to release his debut album in 2013.

2012–2014: Clarity

In 2012, Zedd signed with Interscope Records and released his debut single from the label, "Spectrum", with lyrics and vocals by Matthew Koma. It shot to the top of Billboards Hot Dance Club Songs. He then produced the Eva Simons song, "I Don't Like You", which was also released on Interscope. He also produced and co-wrote the third single "Beauty and a Beat" with Max Martin for Justin Bieber's third studio album, Believe.

On 12 October 2012, Zedd released his debut studio album, Clarity, with "Shave It" as the album's first single and "Spectrum" as its second single. "Clarity", featuring British singer-songwriter Foxes, was released on 1 February 2013 as the album's third single. It charted in the top 10 of Billboard Hot 100, sold 2,238,000 copies, and was certified platinum, making it Zedd's most successful single to date. The song also became the #1 most played on American radio on 10 September 2013. Zedd concluded 2013 with his first worldwide tour, selling out venues across 5 continents.

Zedd worked with Japanese singer Namie Amuro and produced her promotional single, "Heaven" for her album Feel. Zedd would later work with her again in 2015 for her album, genic, although none of his songs were actually featured on the album.

"Stay the Night", featuring Hayley Williams, was released as a single on 10 September 2013, as part of the deluxe version of Zedd's album. The song met similar success, although it was criticized for its lack of uniqueness and less powerful lyrics compared to "Clarity". It ranked in Billboard Hot 100's top 20, and certified platinum as well. In 2013, Zedd produced "Aura", "G.U.Y.", and "Donatella" on Lady Gaga's 2013 album, Artpop. On 26 January 2014, he released the single "Find You" featuring Matthew Koma and Miriam Bryant, which is included on the soundtrack for the film Divergent.

On 3 July 2014, Ariana Grande released a song with Zedd entitled "Break Free", which peaked at No. 4 on the Billboard Hot 100 and peaked at No. 1 on the Hot Dance/Electronic Songs. The song was nominated at the Teen Choice Awards in the category of "Break-Up Song". On 18 December 2014, Moment of Clarity, a documentary about Zedd and his 2013 world tour, was released through his YouTube channel, with Sandra Bullock, Rachel Weisz and Julia Roberts.

2015–2016: True Colors
After taking a six-month break, Zedd announced the release of his second studio album, True Colors. On 23 February 2015, Zedd released his collaboration featuring Selena Gomez, "I Want You to Know". The song was co-written by Zedd, Ryan Tedder of OneRepublic, and Kevin Drew, and produced by the former. The song was nominated for "Choice Party Song" at the Teen Choice Awards and made it to #1 on Billboard's Dance/Electronic Songs and peaked at number 17 on Billboard Hot 100. The song was certified platinum in the US for selling over one million copies.

Zedd released his second single, "Beautiful Now" featuring Jon Bellion, on 13 May 2015. The album, True Colors, was released two days later. The album peaked at number 1 on Billboards Dance/Electronic Albums, and has ranked at other various international charts. The third single from the album, "Papercut", featuring Troye Sivan, was released on 17 July 2015. On 22–23 May, he headlined the Counter Point Music and Arts Festival along with The Roots and Widespread Panic. Along with Eric Prydz, Zedd headlined the first day of 2015 Spring Awakening Festival.

Zedd performed at the 2015 CMT Music Awards with Lady Antebellum. Together, they performed mashup of their songs "Long Stretch of Love" and "Beautiful Now." His second world tour, the True Colors Tour, ran from August to November 2015 and visited Asia, North America and Europe. Zedd was included in the line-up for Coachella 2016. On 26 February 2016, Zedd released the single "Candyman" alongside Aloe Blacc. On 15 July 2016, singer Hailee Steinfeld and producer duo Grey released a song featuring Zedd titled "Starving", which peaked at No. 5 on the Billboard Mainstream Top 40 and No. 5 on the UK Singles Chart.

Zedd released a collaboration with Riot Games for the 2016 League of Legends eSports championship, Worlds, titled "Ignite" on 26 September 2016. He followed up the release of the song with a "Finals Remix" a month later. On 15 December 2016, Zedd released a remix of DJ Snake's hit song "Let Me Love You".

2017–present: Collaborations and singles

In 2017, he organized a benefit concert for the American Civil Liberties Union, prompted in response to US President Donald Trump's executive order to "suspended all refugee admissions for 120 days and blocked citizens of seven Muslim-majority countries, refugees or otherwise". The line-up included Daya, Halsey, Macklemore, Tinashe and Skrillex. On 23 February 2017, Zedd released his collaboration along with Alessia Cara, "Stay" which debuted at number 28 on the Billboard Hot 100 and 33 on the UK Singles Chart. On 6 July 2017, Zedd released his single with Liam Payne, "Get Low".

On 23 January 2018, Zedd released his single with Maren Morris and Grey, "The Middle", which rose to No. 1 on the Billboard Pop Songs radio chart and peaked at No. 5 spot on the Billboard Hot 100. In March 2018, Billboard named Zedd as number seven on their 2018 ranking of dance musicians titled Billboard Dance 100.

Zedd was tapped by National Geographic to make a song inspired by the documentary series One Strange Rock and released a video to the song, also titled "One Strange Rock" on his YouTube channel on 9 April 2018. On 17 July 2018, Zedd released his single with Elley Duhé, "Happy Now". The accompanying music video was later released 23 August 2018.

On 27 September 2018, Zedd released his remix of the Shawn Mendes single "Lost in Japan". This single quickly rose onto the Top 40 charts and was the first collaboration between the two artists. They performed this song at the 2018 American Music Awards on 10 October 2018 and then performed it again at the Victoria's Secret Fashion Show on 8 November 2018. The accompanying music video was released following both performances on 9 November 2018.

On 14 February 2019, Zedd released his collaboration with Katy Perry, "365", along with the song's music video.

Zedd performed at Coachella on the main stage 21 April 2019, bringing out Katy Perry, Alessia Cara, and Maren Morris. On 1 May 2019, Zedd announced the Orbit Tour, which kicks off in the fall of 2019. He will tour along with duo NOTD and Jax Jones.

On 31 May 2019, Katy Perry released her single "Never Really Over" in which Zedd is a producer and a songwriter on the track. The song debuted at number 15 on the US Billboard Hot 100.

On 27 September 2019, Zedd released the single "Good Thing" with Kehlani.

On 10 October 2019, Zedd tweeted that he had been "permanently banned" from China due to his liking of a tweet related to South Park, an American adult animated sitcom which had been banned in the country several days prior as a result of the episode "Band in China".
This seemingly only applies to live performances however, as much of his music remains easily accessible within the country.

On 16 July 2020, Zedd released the single "Funny" with Jasmine Thompson, along with the song's music video.

On 23 October 2020, Zedd released the single "Inside Out" with Griff.

In April 2021, it was revealed that Zedd would have a residency at the new Las Vegas super club Zouk, along with Tiësto, with each receiving US$250,000 per gig. The initial show was set to be on 3 July 2021.

On 13 August 2021, Zedd performed at Musikfest, with the opening acts Gabi DeMartino and Dot.

On 7 September 2021, Valorant announced the collaboration between Zedd and Valorant to create different cosmetic weapon skins which featured exclusive sound effects, as well as a custom tune on the weapons when inspected.

On 28 January 2022, Zedd released the song "You've Got to Let Go If You Want to Be Free" with the English electronic duo Disclosure.

On May 20, 2022, Zedd played at EDC Las Vegas, which was also live streamed.

On 12 August 2022, Zedd started a commercial collaboration with computer peripherals company HyperX (acquired by HP Inc. in 2021) and became its "Global Brand Ambassador".

Personal life
Zedd briefly dated singer and actress Selena Gomez in 2015. He revealed that he hated the media attention surrounding it.

Zedd is a fan of the German football club 1.FC Kaiserslautern.

Discography

Clarity (2012)
True Colors (2015)

Awards and nominations

American Music Awards

APRA Music Awards

Billboard Music Awards

DJ Awards

Grammy Awards

iHeartRadio Music Awards

iHeartRadio Titanium Awards 
iHeartRadio Titanium Awards are awarded to an artist when their song reaches 1 Billion Spins across iHeartRadio Stations.

MTV Europe Music Awards

MTV Video Music Awards

Much Music Video Awards

Radio Disney Music Awards

Teen Choice Awards

Tours and concerts

Headlining 
 Moment of Clarity Tour (2013)
 True Colors Tour (2015)
 Echo Tour (2017–2018)
 Orbit Tour (2019)

Residency 
 Hakkasan Nightclub in Las Vegas (2017-2021)
OMNIA Nightclub in Las Vegas (2017–2021)
Wet Republic in Las Vegas (2017–2021)
 Zouk Nightclub in Las Vegas (2021–Present)

Supporting 
 Meowingtons Hax Tour (Deadmau5, 2011)
 Born This Way Ball (Lady Gaga, 2012, Asia Leg)
 Witness: The Tour (Katy Perry, 2018, Brisbane, Sydney, and Auckland)

Guest appearance 
 Linkin Park and Friends – Celebrate Life in Honor of Chester Bennington (2017) – drums on "Crawling"

Notes

References

External links

 
 

 
1989 births
Living people
APRA Award winners
Electro house musicians
Electronic dance music DJs
21st-century German musicians
German DJs
German house musicians
German record producers
German people of Russian-Jewish descent
Grammy Award winners for dance and electronic music
People from Kaiserslautern
Progressive house musicians
Russian emigrants to Germany
Naturalized citizens of Germany
House musicians
Interscope Records artists
Owsla artists